Alfred Groyer (born 8 January 1959 in Villach) is an Austrian former ski jumper who competed from 1978 to 1984. He finished seventh in the individual normal hill event at the 1980 Winter Olympics in Lake Placid, New York.

Groyer's best career finish was third four times from 1979 to 1982.

External links

Austrian male ski jumpers
Olympic ski jumpers of Austria
Ski jumpers at the 1980 Winter Olympics
Living people
1959 births
Sportspeople from Villach
20th-century Austrian people